Gibb Gilchrist (December 23, 1887 – May 12, 1972) was an American engineer, highway development expert and academic administrator. Gilchrist served as a Texas state highway engineer, president of Texas A&M University and the first chancellor of the Texas A&M University System. Gilchrist received numerous awards and honorary degrees. He is the namesake for several transportation-related entities.

Biography
Gibb Gilchrist was born in Wills Point, Texas, on December 23, 1887. He briefly attended Southwestern University and graduated from the University of Texas at Austin with a civil engineering degree. Gilchrist spent several years with the Santa Fe Railroad, where he rebuilt the Galveston County rail line between High Island and Port Bolivar that had been destroyed in the area's 1915 hurricane.  Gilchrist served in World War I and became a captain of engineers. He went to work for the state highway department in Texas after the war. He married Vesta Weaver in 1920. They had one child, Henry Gilchrist, who became a Dallas attorney.

In 1924, Gilchrist was named state highway engineer. He resigned the next year, shortly after Ma Ferguson was replaced roads advocate Pat Neff as Texas governor. He became an engineering consultant to private business but was again appointed state highway engineer in 1928. Under his direction, a system of roadside rest stops was constructed throughout the state. He resigned in 1936 after Governor James V. Allred used state highway funds to finance an assistance program for the elderly.

In 1937, Gilchrist became the dean of engineering at Texas A&M University. He was appointed university president in 1944. During his presidency, new rules were issued against student hazing, which prompted some student cadets to call for Gilchrist's dismissal.  He became the first chancellor of the Texas A&M College System in 1948. He served in that capacity until 1953. He spent his retirement in College Station. Gilchrist died in College Station on May 12, 1972.

Honors and awards
Gilchrist was awarded an honorary Doctor of Science degree from Austin College in 1939. He was awarded honorary Doctor of Laws degrees from Baylor University and Southwestern University in 1946. Gilchrist was a Mason and he served as Grand Master of the Grand Lodge of Texas in 1952.

Legacy
The community of Gilchrist, Texas, is named for him. The Gibb Gilchrist is one of the vessels in the Galveston Island Ferry fleet. A street in College Station, Texas is named after the Gilchrist family. The Gibb Gilchrist Building of the Texas Transportation Institute is located in Texas A&M's Research Park. The Texas Department of Transportation (TxDOT) issues the Gibb Gilchrist Award to recognize outstanding service within TxDOT.

In 2000, Texas A&M removed a photograph of Gilchrist that had hung at the university because Gilchrist was pictured in front of Confederate Army general Robert E. Lee. In 2002, the picture was returned to the Gibb Gilchrist Building, but it was placed in a first-floor conference room rather than its former location in the building's lobby.

See also
List of Texas A&M University presidents

References

20th-century American engineers
Texas A&M University faculty
Presidents of Texas A&M University
Chancellors of Texas A&M University System
Masonic Grand Masters
1887 births
1972 deaths
People from Wills Point, Texas
20th-century American academics